William Combe (1551–1610), of Middle Temple, London and Warwick, was an English politician.

He was a Member (MP) of the Parliament of England for Chichester in Droitwich in 1589, for Warwick in 1593 and for Warwickshire in 1597.

References

1551 births
1610 deaths
People from Warwick
English MPs 1589
English MPs 1593
English MPs 1597–1598